The Circle of Swabia or Swabian Circle ( or Schwäbischer Kreis) was an Imperial Circle of the Holy Roman Empire established in 1500 on the territory of the former German stem-duchy of Swabia. However, it did not include the Habsburg home territories of Swabian Austria, the member states of the Swiss Confederacy nor the lands of the Alsace region west of the Rhine, which belonged to the Upper Rhenish Circle. The Swabian League of 1488, a predecessor organization, disbanded in the course of the Protestant Reformation and the Thirty Years War later in the 16th century.

Administration
The directors of the Swabian Circle were the Bishop of Constance (replaced by the margrave of Baden after the 1803 Reichsdeputationshauptschluss) and the Duke of Württemberg; meetings of the circle's diet were usually held at the Imperial city of Ulm. Though it was shattered into a multitude of mainly very small states, the circle had an effective government, which, in view of the eastward expansion of France, from 1694 on even maintained its own army based at the Kehl fortress.

As of 1792 the Swabian Circle consisted of 88 territories, of which only the Duchy (later Kingdom)  of Württemberg, the Margraviate ( later Grand Duchy ) of Baden and the Bishopric of Augsburg were of any significance. The Reichsdeputationshauptschluss reduced the number to 41 and the 1806 Rheinbundakte to seven (including the territories that had fallen to Bavaria).

Composition
The circle was made up of the following states:

References
 Imperial Circles in the 16th Century Historical Maps of Germany
https://web.archive.org/web/20110718204310/http://maja.bsz-bw.de/kloester-bw/klostertexte.php?kreis=&bistum=&alle=&ungeteilt=&art=&orden=&orte=1&buchstabe=G&nr=619&thema=Geschichte The History Of Gutenzell (German Version)
https://www.baden-wuerttemberg.de/en/our-state/state-history/ The History Of Baden-Wuttemburg

External links

 
Circles of the Holy Roman Empire
History of Swabia
1500s establishments in the Holy Roman Empire
1500 establishments in Europe